The Brno Highlands is a mountain range in the South Moravian Region in the Czech Republic. The highlands, together with the Jevišovice Highlands threshold, form the South-Moravian part of Moldanubian Zone – southeast part of Bohemian Massif.

Geography
The Brno Highlands rise to the north of the Thaya between Miroslav, and the Prostějov and Litovel in the north.

To the southeast is the Dyje–Svratka Valley. To the north is the Upper Morava Valley. To the southeast is the Vyškov Gate and Dyje–Svratka Valley. Southeast border line of Brno Highlands is also main border of two large geological provinces:  Extendet crust (Bohemian Massif) and Orogeny (Carpatien)

The mountain range in the south is partly fenced and contains several vineyards that constitute part of wine sub-region Mikulovská. Most of the highlands are, since 1956, part of the large protected landscape area Moravian Karst.

The primary composition of the range is Carboniferous granodiorite and flysch.

The Svitava, Svratka and Jihlava among others, originate here. Towns in the area include Blansko, Boskovice, and part of the city of Brno, which gave it its name.

Gallery

References
 Geografický místopisný slovník, Academia, Praha, 1993. 

Mountain ranges of the Czech Republic
Moravia
Highlands